Nudity in religion deals with the differing attitudes to nudity and modesty among world religions.

Ancient Greek religion

Hesiod, the writer of the poem Theogony, which describes the origins and genealogies of the Greek gods in Ancient Greek religion, suggested that farmers should "Sow naked, and plough naked, and harvest naked, if you wish to bring in all Demeter's fruits in due season." Demeter is the goddess of the harvest and agriculture, who presided over grains and the fertility of the earth.

Although most ceremony and traditions involve dressing up, often with some preferential attire, certain cultural or religious traditions actually prescribed ritual nudity. For example, ancient Sparta held a yearly celebration from 668 BC called gymnopaedia during which naked youths displayed their athletic and martial skills through the medium of war dancing.

Abrahamic religions 
The Abrahamic religions of Judaism, Christianity, and Islam all recount the Genesis creation narrative in which Adam and Eve are unaware of their nakedness until they eat the forbidden fruit of the Tree of Knowledge of Good and Evil. After this, they feel ashamed and try to cover themselves with fig leaves. Judaism does not share the Christian association of nakedness with original sin, an aspect integral to the doctrine of redemption and salvation. In Islam the garden is in Paradise, not on Earth. This is to show that women and men should be covered in clothing, for nudity has the stigma of shame attached to it. Each of these religions has its own unique understanding of what is meant to be taught with the recounting of the story of Adam and Eve.

Judaism 

In Judaism, nudity is an aspect of body modesty which is regarded as very important in most social and familial situations. Attitudes to modesty vary between the different movements within Judaism as well as between communities within each movement. In more strict (orthodox) communities, modesty is an aspect of Tzniut which generally has detailed rules of what is appropriate behaviour. Conservative and Reform Judaism generally promote modesty values but do not regard the strict Tzniut rules as binding, with each person being permitted (at least in principle) to set their own standards. With the exception of the Haredi community, Jewish communities generally tend to dress according to the standards of the society in which they find themselves.

Orthodox Jewish Law (Halakha) explicitly makes women responsible for maintaining the virtue of modesty (Tzniut) by covering their bodies, including their hair. For men, nakedness was limited to exposure of the penis, but is not limited to public exposure, but in private as well. In late antiquity, Jews viewed with abhorrence the Greek and Roman practices of going naked and portraying male gods as naked. In any religious context, male nudity was of greater concern than female nudity because it was an offense against God. In everyday activity male nudity might be necessary, but is to be avoided. Female nudity was not an offense against God, but only about arousing the sexual passions of men, thus private or female only nudity was not immodest.

A person who enters a ritual bath (a mikveh) does so without clothing, and with no jewelry or even bandages.

Care needs to be taken when reading the Bible, where some references to nakedness serve as a euphemism for intimate sexual behaviour. For example, in the story of Noah the hesitancy of two of Noah's sons when they have to cover their father's nakedness can be seen, averting their eyes, after Noah's youngest son "saw his father's nakedness and told his two brothers outside" what he had done to his father. Nakedness may also be a metaphor for empty-handedness, specifically in situations where a sacrifice or offering to God is expected.

Christianity

Mainstream Christian denominations 

There are verses in the Christian Bible that discuss the issue of nudity. Before the fall of man, "Nakedness was 'very good' from the beginning, but its innocence was corrupted by the fall", a concept taught in Genesis 1:31 and Genesis 2:25. Genesis 3:8–10, Revelation 3:18 and Revelation 16:15 discuss that after the fall of man, "publicly exposed nakedness [became] a symbol of the shame of sin." In Genesis 3:7, Adam and Eve tried to cover their nakedness, though their attempt was inadequate for God and so God properly clothed humans in Genesis 3:21. Exodus 20:26 and 28:42–43 explicate that God instructed humans to cover their torso and thighs.

The early Church reflected the contemporary attitudes of Judaism towards nudity. The Old Testament is not positive towards nudity. In Isaiah 20, Isaiah walks nude as a sign of shame.

The first recorded liturgy of baptism, written down by Saint Hippolytus of Rome in his Apostolic Tradition, required men, women and children to remove all clothing, including all foreign objects such as jewellery and hair fastenings. However Laurie Guy argues that complete nudity for baptism candidates (especially women) would not be the norm. He notes that at certain times and in certain places candidates may have been totally naked at the point of baptism, but the Jewish taboo of female nakedness would have mitigated widespread practice of naked baptism.

Later Christian attitudes to nudity became more restrictive, and baptisms were segregated by sex and then later were usually performed with clothed participants. Some of the Eastern Orthodox churches today maintain the early church's liturgical use of baptismal nudity, particularly for infants but also for adults.

Several saints, such as a number of the Desert Fathers as well as Basil Fool for Christ, practiced nudity as a form of ascetic poverty.

Early Christian art included depictions of nudity in baptism. When artistic endeavours revived following the Renaissance, the Catholic Church was a major sponsor of art bearing a religious theme, many of which included subjects in various states of dress and including full nudity. Painters sponsored by the Church included Raphael, Caravaggio and Michelangelo, but there were many others. Many of these paintings and statues were and continue to be displayed in churches, some of which were painted as murals, the most famous of which are at the Sistine Chapel painted by Michelangelo.

, in discussing logion 37 of the Gospel of Thomas, notes that early Christian art depicts, as one would expect, Adam and Eve in Paradise naked. The only other Old Testament figures who are depicted nude are Jonah emerging from the mouth of the Great Fish, Daniel emerging from the Lion's Den, and the resurrected in Ezekiel's vision of the dry bones: these Old Testament scenes containing nude figures are precisely those which were held to be types of the resurrection. Among the New Testament illustrations, apart from baptismal scenes, there are nudes only in one representation of the raising of Lazarus and one representation of the Miracle at Cana.

In light of Exodus 29:26 and 28:42–43 in the Bible, which teach that nakedness is inclusive of anything that exposes the torso and thighs, Methodists of the conservative holiness movement wear pants or dresses that go beyond the knees, as well as shirts that cover the underarms.

In 1981, Pope John Paul II expressed the Catholic Church's attitude to the exposure of the human body in Love and Responsibility: "The human body can remain nude and uncovered and preserve intact its splendour and its beauty... Nakedness as such is not to be equated with physical shamelessness... Immodesty is present only when nakedness plays a negative role with regard to the value of the person... The human body is not in itself shameful... Shamelessness (just like shame and modesty) is a function of the interior of a person."

Christian naturist sects 

Sects have arisen within Christianity from time to time that have viewed nudity in a more positive light. For example, to the Adamites and the Freedomites, social nudity was an integral part of their ritual. The Adamites, an early Christian sect, practiced "holy nudism", engaging in common worship in the nude. During the Middle Ages, the doctrines of this obscure sect were revived: in the Netherlands by the Brethren of the Free Spirit and the Taborites in Bohemia, and, in a grosser form, by the Beghards in Germany. Everywhere, they met with firm opposition from the mainstream Christian churches.

A religious sect in Canada that immigrated from Russia, the Sons of Freedom, went so far in the 20th century (1903–1950s) as to publicly strip in mass public demonstrations to protest against government policies which were meant to assimilate them.

Christian naturism contains various members associated with most denominations. Although beliefs vary, a common theme is that much of Christianity has misinterpreted the events regarding the Garden of Eden, and God was displeased with Adam and Eve for covering their bodies with fig leaves.  argues that the significance of the human need for clothing by far exceeds its theological meaning.

Islam
Islamic countries are guided by rules of modesty that forbid nudity, with variations between five schools of Islamic law. The most conservative is the Hanbali School in Saudi Arabia and Qatar, where it is widespread for women wear the niqab, the garment covering the whole body and the face with a narrow opening for the eyes. Hands are also hidden within sleeves as much as possible. The burqa, limited mainly to Afghanistan, also has a mesh screen which covers the eye opening. Different rules apply to men, women, and children; and depend upon the gender and family relationship of others present. The Sunni scholar Yusuf al-Qaradawi states that looking at the intimate parts of the body of another of either sex must be avoided. For women after puberty, the prohibition includes the entire body except the hands and face. However, hands and face may be shown only if they may be viewed without temptation. Men must cover themselves from the navel to the knees. Shame dictates that the genitals should be covered even when a person is alone. The dress of women must not only cover virtually the entire body, but cannot be either transparent or close-fitting to reveal the shape of the body. When onlookers are close relations, prohibitions for women do not include hair, ears, neck, upper part of the chest, arms and legs. The same exceptions are also made for men seeing women to whom they are proposing marriage.

Indian/Dharmic religions 

In ancient Indian cultures, there was a tradition of extreme asceticism (obviously minoritarian) that included full nudity. This tradition continued from the gymnosophists (philosophers in antiquity) to certain holy men (who may however cover themselves with ashes) in present-day Hindu devotion and in Jainism.

In the 4th century BC, Alexander the Great encountered, in India, wandering groups of naked holy men whom he dubbed the naked philosophers (Gr gymnos: naked; sophist: knowledge). The philosopher Onesicritus investigated their beliefs and lifestyle. Pyrrho the Sceptic was impressed and incorporated nudity into his philosophy. The Gymnosophists were Hindus, but Jain and Ajivika monks practiced nudity as a statement that they had given up all worldly goods.

Hinduism

Philosophical basis
The philosophical basis of nudity arises out of the concept of 'Purushartha' (four ends of human life). 'Purushartha' (Puruṣārtha) are 'Kama' (enjoyment), 'Artha' (wealth), ‘Dharma’ (virtue) and 'Moksha' (liberation). It is ‘Purushartha’ which impels a human being towards nudity or any of its related aspect(s) either for spiritual aim or for the aim of enjoyment. Practice of ‘Dharma’ (virtue) brings good result(s) and non-practice of 'Dharma' leads to negative result(s).

Spiritual basis
In the spiritual aspect of Hinduism nudity symbolizes renunciation ('tyaga' in Hindi) of the highest type. A nude person or deity (for example Kali is a nude deity) denotes one who is devoid of Maya or attachment to the body and one who is an embodiment of infinity. Trailanga Swami, the famous nude saint of India, had given an explanation for nudity in religion in the following words, "Lahiri Mahasaya is like a divine kitten, remaining wherever the Cosmic Mother has placed him. While dutifully playing the part of a worldly man, he has received that perfect Self-realization which I have sought by renouncing everything – even my loincloth!"

Material basis
In comparison in the material aspect nudity is considered an art. This view is supported by Sri Aurobindo in his book The Renaissance in India. He says about Hinduism in the book – "Its spiritual extremism could not prevent it from fathoming through a long era the life of the senses and its enjoyments, and there too it sought the utmost richness of sensuous detail and the depths and intensities of sensual experience. Yet it is notable that this pursuit of the most opposite extremes never resulted in disorder…"
Extreme hedonists and materialists like the Charvakas are very candid with regard to pursuing of sensual pleasures. They say, "Marthakamaveva purusharthau" (Riches and pleasure is the summum bonum of life). There is another sloka in support of their view – "Anganalingananadijanyam sukhameva purusatha" (The sensual pleasure arising from the embrace of a woman and other objects is the highest good or end). For non-hedonists pursuing kama (sensual pleasures) accompanied with dharma (virtue) can be the highest ideal or goal in life. There is nothing wrong in it.

Occurrence
Some of the famous nude male and female yogi (male and female saints of India) of Hinduism include Lalla Yogishwari (Lalleshwari), Trailanga Swami, Harihar Baba, Tota Puri. Also in the biography of saint Gorakhnath we have reference to  nude male and female yogis who had visited the famous Amarnath Temple during medieval period of India.

Among the Hindu religious sects, only the sadhus (monks) of the Nāga sect can be seen nude. They usually wear a loin-cloth around their waist, but not always; and usually remain in their Akhara or deep forest or isolation and come out in public only once every four years during Kumbh Mela. They have a very long history and are warrior monks, who usually also carry a talwar (sword), trishul (trident), bhala (javelin) or such weapons, and in medieval times have fought many wars to protect Hindu temples and shrines.

Jainism 

In India, Digambara monks reject any form of clothing and practice nudity. Digambara (lit. 'sky clad') is one of the two main sects of Jainism. However, the Shwetambar sect is "white-clad" and their holy statues wear a loin cloth.

New religious movements

New Gymnosophy Society 
The first English naturists adopted the name Gymnosophy as a thinly disguised euphemism for their pastime. The English Gymnosophical Society was formed in 1922 and became the New Gymnosophy Society in 1926; they purchased land at 'Bricket Wood' to become Britain's first nudist colony. One of the first members was Gerald Gardner, who in 1945 established the 'Five Acres Club' nearby, ostensibly as a nudist club, but as a front for Wiccans, as witchcraft was illegal in England until 1951.

Neopaganism 

In many modern neopagan religious movements, such as Wicca, social and ritual nudity is (relatively) commonplace. In Wicca, the term skyclad refers to ritual nudity instead of social nudity.

Raëlism 

In Raëlism, nudity is not problematic. Raëlists in North America have formed GoTopless.org, which organizes demonstrations in support of topfreedom on the basis of the legal and public attitudes to the gender inequality. GoTopless sponsors an annual "Go Topless Day" protest (also known as "National GoTopless Day", "International Go-Topless Day", etc.) in advocacy for women's right to go topless on gender equality grounds.

See also

References

Notes

Citations

Sources

Further reading

External links

Christian Nudist Convocation : Supporting and Gathering Christian Nudists
gotopless.org
Raëlism: Publicity as a Recruitment Technique

 
Religious practices
Religion and society